Robert Cooper Wills was Archdeacon of Cloyne  from 1889  until 1919.

Wills was born at Carrick-on-Shannon on 30 December 1836, educated at Trinity College, Dublin and ordained in 1862.  After curacies at Shinrone, Dunkerrin and Lorrha he held incumbencies at Kanturk  and Timoleague before his appointment as Archdeacon.

References

1836 births
People from County Leitrim
Alumni of Trinity College Dublin
Archdeacons of Cloyne
Year of death missing